Yi Gu (이구; 6 January 1420 – 21 January 1469),  formally known as Grand Prince Imyeong (임영대군), was an imperial prince of the Joseon dynasty. He was the fourth son of King Sejong. His brothers were King Munjong of Joseon and King Sejo of Joseon.

Life 
Yi Gu was born as the son of King Sejong and his wife, Queen Soheon.Like his second older brother, Prince Suyang, he was proficient in martial arts, but he also created a scandal due to having sexual intercourse with court ladies and maids of the palace. During the Gyeyujeong Rebellion, when Prince Suyang fought for the throne with his nephew, Yi Gu supported and helped Prince Suyang.Prince Imyeong greatly assisted Prince Suyang and contributed to the enthronement of Daegun Suyang as King Sejo.

From an early age, he was proud and kept a filial attitude to his parents and brothers. When he was a child, he was praised for being sincere.His father, King Sejong was very fond of him.

Yi Gu married Royal Princess Consort Nam but their marriage was problematic. Lady Nam, after a month of marriage, divorced him.

At age of 20, he became the Yeonguijeong.

Yi Gu died on January 21, 1469. He was buried in Gyeonggi-do Uiwang-si.

Family 
Parents

 Father: Sejong the Great of Joseon (세종대왕, 15 May 1397 – 8 April 1450)
 Mother: Queen Soheon of the Cheongsong Sim clan (12 October 1395 – 19 April 1446) (소헌왕후 심씨)
 Older sister: Princess Jeongso (1412 – 1424) (정소공주)
 Older brother: Yi Hyang, King Munjong (15 November 1414 – 1 June 1452) (왕세자 향)
 Older sister: Princess Jeongui (1415 – 11 February 1477) (정의공주)
 Older brother: Yi Yu, King Sejo (2 November 1417 – 23 September 1468) (이유 수양대군)
 Older brother: Yi Yong, Grand Prince Anpyeong (18 October 1418 – 18 November 1453) (이용 안평대군)
 Younger brother: Yi Yeo, Grand Prince Gwangpyeong (2 May 1425 – 7 December 1444) (이여 광평대군)
 Younger brother: Yi Yu, Grand Prince Geumseong (5 May 1426 – 7 November 1457) (이유 금성대군)
 Younger brother: Yi Im, Grand Prince Pyeongwon (18 November 1427 – 16 January 1445) (이임 평원대군)
 Younger brother: Yi Yeom, Grand Prince Yeongeung (23 May 1434 – 2 February 1467) (이염 영응대군)

Consort and issues:

 Princess Consort Nam of the Uiryeong Nam clan (군부인 의령 남씨); daughter of Nam Ji (남지 )
 Princess Consort Jean of the Jeonju Choi clan (제안부부인 전주최씨)
 Son: Prince Ohsan (오산군)
 Son: Prince Gwiseong (귀성군) (20 January 1441 – 28 January 1479)
 Son: Prince Jeongyang (정양군)
 Son: Prince Palgye (팔계군 )
 Son: Prince Hwanseong  (환성군)
 Daughter: Princess Jungmo (중모현주)
 Daughter: Princess Cheongha (청하현주)
 Princess Consort Ahn of the Andong Ahn clan (부부인 안동 안씨)
 Son: Prince Yeongyang (영양군함)
 Son: Dangye Bujeong (단계부정)
 Son: Prince Yunsan (윤산군)
 Son: Prince Okcheon (옥천군)
 Daughter: Princess Yi of the Jeonju Yi clan (전주이씨)
 Daughter: Princess Yi of the Jeonju Yi clan (전주이씨)
 Daughter: Princess Yi of the Jeonju Yi clan (전주이씨)
 Daughter: Princess Yi of the Jeonju Yi clan (전주이씨)
 Lady Geumgangmae (첩 금강매)

See also 

 Styles and titles in the Joseon dynasty
 Gungnyeo

References 

 
 
 

1420 births
1469 deaths
Joseon scholar-officials